FRANCIS is an academic bibliographic database maintained by INIST. FRANCIS covers the core academic literature in the humanities and social sciences with special emphasis on European literature.

INIST-CNRS is now providing free access to the FRANCIS database, along with PASCAL database content, on their website.

See also

References

Bibliographic databases and indexes
Databases in France
Scientific databases
French National Centre for Scientific Research